Laptevka is a village in the Kolyvansky District of Novosibirsk Oblast, Russia, located on the Vasyugan Swamp. Population: 74 (2010 Census); 111 (2007 Census); 118 (2002 Census).

History
The village is named after the Laptev who founded it.

External links
 Всероссийская перепись населения 2010 года. Численность населения городских и сельских населенных пунктов Новосибирской области. 
 Реестр населённых пунктов Новосибирской области (подготовлен департаментом организации управления администрации Новосибирской области). Газета «Советская Сибирь», № 146, 31 июля 2007 года. 
 Всероссийская перепись населения 2002 года. Численность населения по сельским населенным пунктам Новосибирской области. 

Rural localities in Novosibirsk Oblast